Richard Fuller  (born 1960) is an Australian-born, US-based engineer, entrepreneur and environmentalist best known for his work in global pollution remediation.

He is founder and CEO of the nonprofit Pure Earth (formerly known as Blacksmith Institute); co-chair of The Lancet Commission on Pollution and Health; chair of the board for the Global Alliance on Health and Pollution; and founder of Great Forest, inc.,  a leading sustainable waste management consultancy.

In October 2022, Richard Fuller was included in the #FuturePerfect50 list from Vox  recognizing “The scientists, thinkers, scholars, writers, and activists building a more perfect future.” In June 2018, Fuller was awarded the Order of Australia Medal (OAM) in recognition of his service to conservation and the environment. In October 2019, Fuller received an Advance Award for Social Impact from the Australian government for his 20 years of pioneering work with Pure Earth and his leadership in tacking the issue as "a toxic pollution fighting hero"

He is author of The Brown Agenda: My Mission To Clean up The World's Most Life-Threatening Pollution.

Early career

Richard Fuller graduated with a degree in Engineering from Melbourne University and began work for IBM. He left Australia in 1988 to work in the Amazon rainforests of Brazil with the United Nations Environmental Programme.

In 1989, he established Great Forest Inc in New York to work on sustainability and commercial waste solutions for buildings and corporations in the pioneering days of corporate social responsibility. Wanting to make a bigger impact on global environmental issues, Fuller used profits from Great Forest to launch the nonprofit Pure Earth to tackle the problem on a larger scale. A portion of Great Forest's profits continues to support Pure Earth's work.

Pure Earth/Blacksmith Institute 
In 1999, Fuller established Pure Earth (formerly known as Blacksmith Institute) to focus on pollution remediation. Pure Earth is dedicated to solving pollution problems in low and middle-income countries, where human health is at risk.

Over the years, Pure Earth has completed over 120 cleanup pilot projects in 24 countries, and assessed over 5000 toxic sites in 50 countries.

In a 2010 profile, Time magazine's Power of One column described his motivation: "The low priority that the world—including the media—tends to place on toxic pollution in developing countries is one of the reasons Fuller founded the nonprofit Blacksmith Institute"(renamed Pure Earth in 2015).

Quantifying Pollution 
Fuller recognized the need to measure and quantify pollution in order to advocate for action to solve pollution. The set of tools he helped to develop include:

 The Blacksmith Index, developed with Johns Hopkins University and used around the world to rate levels of health risk from pollution;
 The Toxic Sites Identification Program (TSIP) trains local investigators to identify and assess hot spots. To date, TSIP has trained over 400 investigators worldwide, who have mapped and documented more than 5,000 toxic sites in over 50 countries. 
 The TSIP database of polluted sites, one of the largest of its kind, contains data collected through the TSIP. Countries can access the database to find pollution data to help them prioritize the cleanup of sites that pose the most risk to residents.
 Pollution.org  offers a public global snapshot of pollution sites around the world with data from the TSIP database.

Forming Global Alliances To Solve Pollution

Global Alliance on Health and Pollution 
In 2012, Fuller initiated the Global Alliance on Health and Pollution to bring countries together to build public, political, technical and financial support to address pollution globally, and assist low- and middle-income countries to fight pollution.

Lancet Commission on Pollution and Health 
These efforts led Fuller to help convene and co-chair the Lancet Commission on Pollution and Health, an initiative of The Lancet, the Global Alliance on Health and Pollution, and the Icahn School of Medicine at Mount Sinai, with additional coordination and input from United Nations Environment, United Nations Industrial Development Organization, and the World Bank.

The Commission brought together over 40 international health and environmental authors that produced a report in 2017 providing the first comprehensive estimates of the effects of global pollution on health and economy worldwide. The report concluded that pollution is the largest environmental cause of death in the world, killing over 9 million people worldwide, threatening the "continuing survival of human societies."

The report generated immense global interest, reaching over 2 billion people worldwide with news coverage including the Guardian, PBS NewsHour and Fareed Zakaria, who devoted his "What In The World" segment to the report.

In an open letter to mark the release of the report from The Lancet Commission on Pollution and Health, Fuller writes: "For too long, pollution has been sidelined, overshadowed, ignored by the world, in part because it is a complicated topic with many causes, and as many outcomes. Often it kills slowly, and indirectly, hiding its tracks. With this report, we bring pollution out of the shadows."

Global Observatory on Pollution and Health 
In October 2018, Fuller joined former EPA Administrator Gina McCarthy; Erik Solheim, UNEP; Dr. Philip Landrigan, Boston College; and Pushpam Kumar, UNEP at the launch of the Global Observatory on Pollution and Health.

Advocacy 

Fuller's focus is not on pollution in general, but more specifically on disease-causing pollution that impacts the health of people, especially those living in low- and middle-income countries. He believes pollution can be solved: "There’s a finite number of polluted sites out there, and you can fix them for relatively little." "The good news is we have known technologies and proven strategies for eliminating a lot of this pollution."

In 2014, Fuller, on behalf of the Global Alliance on Health and Pollution, called on the UN to spotlight pollution in the Sustainable Development Goals.

In 2015, fuller wrote: "Pollution is the leading cause of death in low- and middle-income countries… The good news is that these problems are fixable. Moreover, when that happens, the biggest single source of death on the planet — let alone an enormous drain on human and environmental well-being, not to mention economic growth — will be vanquished."

In 2017 The UNEP acknowledged Fuller’s message publishing "The Impact of Pollution on Planetary Health: Emergence of an Underappreciated Risk Factor." 

In 2019, he co-authored Pollution and Children's Health, 
which noted "Pollution was responsible in 2016 for 940,000 deaths in children, two-thirds under age 5," and that "92% of pollution-related deaths in children occur in low- and middle-income countries." He concluded that "pollution prevention presents a major, largely unexploited opportunity to improve children’s health especially in low and middle-income countries."

In a speech to World Bank in 2018, Fuller noted " … toxic pollution is the largest cause of death in the world. Yet it is one of the most underreported and underfunded global problems."

Fuller’s advocacy efforts over the years have had an impact.

In 2015, his work with Pure Earth and the Global Alliance on Health and Pollution successfully led to a broadening of the scope of toxic pollution addressed in the Sustainable Development Goals (SDGs), as described in a profile in the UN Dispatch: "We managed to get a target written in — 3.9 — within the health goal that says we need to substantially reduce death and disability from all types of pollution. That means contaminated sites, air, water, and ground pollution from chemicals."

Success with the SDGs brought greater global attention to the issue, which continued with the publication of the report from the Lancet Commission on Pollution and Health in 2017. Fuller was invited to present  the report's findings at the World Economic Forum meeting in Davos in February 2018. He was also invited to provide briefings of the report at the World Bank, the UN, the National Academies of Sciences, Engineering and Medicine, the OECD, and other international development and professional meetings.

The Brown Agenda 
In 2015, Santa Monica Press published "The Brown Agenda: My Mission To Clean Up The World's Most Life-Threatening Pollution", written by Fuller and Damon DiMarco. The book documents Fuller's adventures at some of the world's most toxic locations, and introduces readers to the plight of the poisoned poor, suggesting specific ways in which anyone can help combat brown sites all over the world.

In a 2015 interview about the book on The Takeaway on NPR, Fuller noted the differences in approaches to climate change and pollution: "... over the last couple of decades, climate change has taken over as the key environmental issue. So now we find that the agenda of these countries is biodiversity and climate change, and pollution has simply dropped off the map. This is an extraordinary result and one we really need to turn around."

"We've already solved most of the pollution problems in the West. There aren't people dying in droves in the U.S. or in England - they're all dying overseas, in low- and middle-income countries," he told the Thomson Reuters Foundation. on the publication of the book.

References

External links
 Blacksmith Institute
 Great Forest, Inc.
 World's Worst Polluted Places Reports

1960 births
Living people
Australian environmentalists
Recipients of the Medal of the Order of Australia